Scutellonema brachyurum (British spiral nematode, Carolina spiral nematode) is a plant pathogenic nematode Infecting African violets.

References

External links 
 Nemaplex, University of California - Scutellonema brachyurum

Tylenchida
Plant pathogenic nematodes